The Scotland national cricket team represents the country of Scotland. They play their home matches at The Grange, Edinburgh, and also some other venues.

Scotland became Associate Members of the International Cricket Council (ICC) in 1994 after severing links with the England cricket team two years earlier. Since then, they have played in three ODI World Cups (1999, 2007 and 2015) and five T20 World Cup tournaments (2007, 2009, 2016, 2021 and 2022). However, their first win in either of these events did not come until they beat Hong Kong in the 2016 T20 World Cup. Scottish cricket team is governed by Cricket Scotland.

Scotland have also played in every ICC Intercontinental Cup tournament, winning the inaugural edition in 2004. Between 2010 and 2013, the team competed in the ECB 40 as the Scottish Saltires.

In April 2018, the ICC decided to grant full Twenty20 International (T20I) status to all its members. Therefore, all Twenty20 matches played between Scotland and other ICC members after 1 January 2019 are a full T20I.

History

Before ICC Membership
The first recorded cricket match in Scotland took place in Alloa in 1785. It would be another eighty years, however, before Scotland's national side played their first full match, against the English county Surrey in 1865, which they won by 172 runs.

The first Scottish Cricket Union was formed in 1879, and the national team beat Australia by 7 wickets three years later. The cricket union became defunct in 1883, and Grange Cricket Club took over the administration of the game until 1909. The first match against Ireland took place in Dublin in 1888, with Ireland winning. Scotland played their first match to be afforded first-class status against the touring Australians in 1905, with the Scottish side being captained to a draw by Hubert Johnston. They also played South Africa, West Indies, an all-Indian team, and New Zealand before the start of World War II.

1948 saw Australia visit Scotland for two games at the end of their tour of England. These games, both of which were won by the Australians, were to be the last international games for Don Bradman. The Don signed off in typical style, making a fine unbeaten 123 in the innings victory.

Scotland first competed in English domestic cricket in 1980, when they competed in the Benson & Hedges Cup for the first time. Three years later they took part in the NatWest Trophy. Their first Benson & Hedges win came against Lancashire in 1986.

Scottish cricketers

The most famous cricketers to have come from Scotland are probably the former England captain, Mike Denness, Warwickshire all-rounder Dougie Brown, and former England Test player Gavin Hamilton. Another great Scottish cricketer was Brian Hardie, who was a major contributor to the successful Essex side of the 1970s and 1980s. Possibly one of the best spinners and certainly a respected journalist was the aptly named Ian Peebles, who was one of the cricketers of the year in 1931 alongside Don Bradman.

The most infamous cricketer, a man who was vilified in Australia, was a Scot, Douglas Jardine, father to and inventor of "Body Theory", which is well documented under "Bodyline". Jardine was born in British India, and died in Switzerland, spending most of his life in England. However, his parents were Scottish. He asked for his ashes to be scattered in Scotland and gave his own children Scottish names.

ICC Membership

In 1992, Scotland severed their ties with the Test and County Cricket Board (TCCB) and England, and gained Associate Membership of the ICC in their own right in 1994. They competed in the ICC Trophy for the first time in 1997, finishing third and qualifying for the 1999 World Cup, where they played their first ODI.

The 2001 ICC Trophy saw them finish 4th, losing a play-off game to Canada, but they won the 2005 tournament, beating long-time rivals Ireland in the final. 2004 saw Scotland first confirm themselves as one of the leading associate nations by winning the inaugural Intercontinental Cup. However, they did not progress beyond the first round in the 2005 tournament.

2006

March 2006 saw Scotland embark on a pre-season tour to Barbados. They performed with some credit, although they only won one of their 6 games, against a Barbados XI. They owed much of their success to Nik Morton, who re-qualified to represent Scotland internationally in 2004. They competed in the C & G Trophy in English domestic cricket in the early part of the 2006 English cricket season. They performed better than expected, winning three of their nine games, and finishing eighth in the Northern conference.

In June, they played their first ODI since the 1999 World Cup when they took on Pakistan in Edinburgh. Without key players Dougie Brown and Navdeep Poonia, they lost by five wickets. They finally got their first ODI win in the European Championships in August with a win over Holland in a rain-shortened game. They again missed key players for some games in this tournament though, and thanks to their loss against Ireland, finished second in the tournament.

During 2006 and early 2007, Scotland participated in the third edition of the Intercontinental Cup. They beat Namibia by an innings in May 2006, but draws against Ireland in August and the United Arab Emirates in January 2007 meant that they failed to reach the final. In December 2006, they travelled to Test nation Bangladesh for a two-match ODI series – their first outside the UK – but lost both matches heavily.

2007
In January 2007, after the Intercontinental Cup match against United Arab Emirates in Sharjah, they travelled to Kenya, first playing in a tri-series against Canada and Kenya in Mombasa, where they finished second. This was followed by Division One of the World Cricket League in Nairobi, where Scotland finished as runners up.

They then travelled to West Indies for their second World Cup. They again lost all their games and failed to progress beyond the first round. Back in the UK, they competed in the Friends Provident Trophy, their only win coming against Lancashire. They also drew an Intercontinental Cup match against United Arab Emirates. An ODI against Pakistan in July was washed out.

In July, Scotland took part in a quadrangular series in Ireland against the hosts, Holland and West Indies. However, the endeavour was not a success. They lost their matches against Ireland and West Indies, with the match against Holland being abandoned due to rain.

At the beginning of August, Scotland were on Intercontinental Cup duty as they beat Holland by an innings and 59 runs. They then drew with Ireland in a rain-affected match, only gaining 3 points after a poor 1st innings display. India were Scotland's next ODI opponents in mid-August, which was shown live on BBC Scotland from Titwood, Glasgow. The match was reduced slightly to 46 overs after a couple of brief showers, but India won by 7 wickets.

Having reached the final of the World Cricket League earlier in the year, Scotland qualified to play in the Twenty20 World Championship held in South Africa. They lost by 51 runs to Pakistan in their first game, and did not get a chance to play their other Group D opponents India, as the game was washed out without a ball being bowled.

2008

In July 2008, Scotland played a tri-series against New Zealand and Ireland in Aberdeen, Scotland. Scotland beat Ireland but lost their match against New Zealand.

In early August, Scotland participated with five other Associate nations in the 2009 ICC World Twenty20 Qualifier in Belfast. Despite an initial loss to hosts Ireland, victory against Bermuda secured a semi final slot. Throwing off the disappointment of an unexpected loss to Holland in the semi-final a few hours earlier, Scotland bounced right back for a 9 wicket victory over Kenya (who had advanced ahead of Canada), to secure third place. However, with only two nations guaranteed to progress, qualification for the 2009 ICC World Twenty20 was only granted when Zimbabwe confirmed that they would not attend the tournament.

On 18 August, Scotland played their first ODI encounter against England. Hosting the Auld Enemy, at the Grange Cricket Club in Edinburgh. However the match was abandoned due to rain after less than 3 overs of England's reply to Scotland's 156/9.

In December 2008, Cricket Scotland, the governing body of Scottish cricket, took the historic act of giving three Scotland players central contracts. Bowlers Gordon Goudie and Dewald Nel and captain Ryan Watson became the first full-time professional cricketers based in Scotland. Nineteen other cricketers have been offered part-time professional deals.

2009
Scotland participated in the 2009 ICC World Twenty20 in England in June 2009. They were drawn alongside Test nations New Zealand and South Africa in Group D, with both matches being played at The Oval in London.

The first match, against New Zealand, was shortened to 7 overs per side due to rain. Scotland batted first and made 89/4, with Kyle Coetzer top-scoring with 33. However, three no-balls and a dropped catch enabled New Zealand to win by seven wickets with an over to spare.

In the second match, South Africa made 211/5, with AB de Villiers hitting 79 not out off only 34 balls. In response, Scotland were bowled out for 81, more than half of which was scored by Coetzer (42). The 130-run margin of defeat was the second-largest in terms of runs in a Twenty20 International.

2010
In 2010, Scotland took part in the inaugural ECB 40 tournament.

Scotland competed in the qualifiers in the United Arab Emirates, to compete for a place in the 2010 ICC World Twenty20 in the West Indies. They competed for a place with Afghanistan, Canada, Ireland, Kenya, Holland, United Arab Emirates and USA. The tournament was disappointing for Scotland, going out in the group stage without winning a single match.

Scotland's Intercontinental Cup campaign was more successful as they reached the final in December – against Afghanistan – at the bespoke new cricket stadium in Dubai. Scheduled as a four-day first-class match of two innings each side, Afghanistan won the game in eight sessions. This was also the first cricket match of any kind that was live-streamed online – by two Scottish fans, with the agreement of the ICC.

ICC World Cup Qualifiers
During March and April 2009 Scotland attempted to defend the ICC Trophy they won in 2005. To secure qualification for the 2011 Cricket World Cup a top four place was targeted. They were also attempting to secure ODI status by finishing in the top six.

Scotland started the tournament badly by losing three of their five group games. With only the points earned against Namibia being taken through to the Super Eights, Scotland faced a difficult route to the World Cup.

Scotland started the Super Eights well by beating Holland in their first match. Defeats against Kenya and Afghanistan followed. The result of which threatened Scotland's qualification for the World Cup as well as the possibility of losing their ODI status if they finished out of the top six.

Victory against United Arab Emirates in their last game, and an improved run-rate, thanks to the 122 run victory, ensured a top six place for the Scots, securing ODI status until the next round of World Cup qualifiers.

In 2012, Scotland achieved their first victory against a full member of the ICC when it defeated a touring Bangladesh side.

The Scottish team qualified for the ICC Cricket World Cup 2015 in Australia and New Zealand, but was eliminated after six straight losses out of six matches.

In January 2017 Scotland took part in the 2017 Desert T20 Challenge. They won all three of their group fixtures, before losing to Ireland in the semi-finals.

Zimbabwe tour of Scotland in 2017

Scotland achieved their second victory against a full member of the ICC when it defeated a touring Zimbabwe side.

2018
Scotland achieved their third victory against a full member of the ICC when it defeated a touring England side.

2022
Scotland achieved their fourth victory against a full member of the ICC when it defeated the West Indies in the first round of the 2022 ICC T20 World Cup.

International grounds

Tournament history

World Cup

{| class="wikitable" style="text-align: center;"
!colspan="9"|World Cup record
|-
! width=150 |Year
! width=120 |Round
! width=50 |Position
! width=50 |GP
! width=50 |W
! width=50 |L
! width=50 |T
! width=50 |NR
|-
| 1975 || colspan="7" rowspan="5"|Not eligible (not an ICC member)
|-
| 1979
|-
| 1983
|-
|  1987
|-
|  1992
|-
|   1996 || colspan="7"|Not eligible (not an ICC member at time of qualification)
|-
|style="border: 3px solid red"| 1999 || Group stage || 12/12 || 5 || 0 || 5 || 0 || 0
|-
| 2003 || colspan="7"|Did not qualify
|-
| 2007 || Group stage || 15/16 || 3 || 0 || 3 || 0 || 0
|-
|   2011 || colspan="7"|Did not qualify
|-
|  2015 || Group stage || 14/14 || 6 || 0 || 6 || 0 || 0
|-
|  2019 || colspan="7"|Did not qualify
|-
| 2023|| colspan='9'|TBD|-
| Total || Group Stage || 3/12 || 14 || 0 || 14 || 0 || 0
|}

T20 World Cup

Other tournaments

‡ Only the matches between Scotland, Ireland and Netherlands in the 2006 tournament have official ODI status.

Current squad
This lists all the active players who have been selected in the team's most recent ODI or T20I squad. Uncapped players are italics. Updated as on 8 December 2022.

Key
S/N = Shirt number

Note - Kyle Coetzer has retired from T20Is. Calum MacLeod played the recent 2022 ICC Men's T20 World Cup, but has announced his retirement from international cricket.

Coaching staff

Coaching history

2002–2004:  Tony Judd
2005–2006:  Andy Moles
2006–2007:  Peter Drinnen
2007:  Peter Steindl &  Andy Tennant (acting)
2007–2013:  Peter Steindl
2013–2014:  Paul Collingwood &  Craig Wright (acting)
2014:  Craig Wright (acting)
2014–2018:  Grant Bradburn
2018–2019:  Toby Bailey (acting)
2019–2023:  Shane Burger
2023–present:  Doug Watson

Records and statistics

International match summary – ScotlandLast updated 21 February 2023.One-Day Internationals
 Highest team total: 371/5 v. England, 10 June 2018 at Grange Cricket Club, Edinburgh
 Highest individual score: 175, Calum MacLeod v. Canada, 27 January 2014 at Hagley Oval, Christchurch
 Best individual bowling figures: 6/28, Josh Davey v. Afghanistan, 14 January 2015 at Sheikh Zayed Cricket Stadium, Abu Dhabi

Most ODI runs for Scotland

Most ODI wickets for Scotland

Highest individual innings in ODI

Best bowling figures in an innings in ODI

ODI record versus other nationsRecords complete to ODI #4520. Last updated 21 February 2023.Twenty20 Internationals
 Highest team total: 252/3 v. Netherlands, 16 September 2019 at Malahide Cricket Club Ground, Malahide 
 Highest individual score: 127*, George Munsey v. Netherlands, 16 September 2019 at Malahide Cricket Club Ground, Malahide
 Best individual bowling figures: 5/24, Alasdair Evans v. Netherlands, 11 July 2015 at The Grange Club, Edinburgh

Most T20I runs for Scotland

Most T20I wickets for Scotland

T20I record versus other nationsRecords complete to T20I #1838. Last updated 21 October 2022.''

See also

Cricket in Scotland
List of Scotland ODI cricketers
List of Scotland T20I cricketers
List of Scotland national cricket captains
Sport in Scotland
Scotland women's national cricket team

References

Notes

Bibliography

 
 

National cricket teams
Cricket in Scotland
Cricket
Scotland in international cricket